Petershagen (Uckermark) station is a railway station in the municipality of Luckow-Petershagen, located in the Uckermark district in Brandenburg, Germany.

References

Railway stations in Brandenburg
Buildings and structures in Uckermark (district)
Railway stations in Germany opened in 1908
1908 establishments in Prussia